Antonelli is an Italian surname. Notable people with the surname include:

Alessandro Antonelli (1798–1888), Italian architect
Andrea Antonelli (1988–2013), Italian motorcycle racer
Andrea Kimi Antonelli (born 2006), Italian racing driver
Cosimo Antonelli (1925–2014), Italian water polo player
Domenico Antonelli (1857–1943), Manufacturer of Ice Cream Cones and Wafers at International Wafer Company
Dominic A. Antonelli (born 1967), NASA astronaut
Ennio Antonelli (born 1936), Roman Catholic Cardinal
Filippo Antonelli (born 1978), Italian football player
Giacomo Antonelli (1806–1876), 19th-century lay cardinal
Giovanna Antonelli Prado (born 1976), Brazilian actress
John W. Antonelli (1917–1999), American Marine Corps general and Navy Cross recipient
Johnny Antonelli (1930–2020), baseball player
Juan Bautista Antonelli Italian engineer of the 15th century
Kathleen Antonelli (1921–2006), ENIAC programmer
Laura Antonelli (1941–2015), former Italian film actress
Leonardo Antonelli (1730–1811), Italian Cardinal
Lou Antonelli (born 1957), American writer
Louis Antonelli, American filmmaker and poet
Luca Antonelli (born 1987), Italian football player
Marco Antonelli (born 1964), Italian racing driver
Matt Antonelli (born 1985), baseball player
Niccolò Antonelli (born 1996), Italian Grand Prix motorcycle racer
Paola Antonelli (born 1963), Italian architect
Paul J Antonelli (born 1981), Noted Exercise Physiologist & MMA Coach
Severo Antonelli (1907–1995), Italian-American photographer
Tilli Antonelli (born 1955), Italian entrepreneur and yacht manufacturer

See also

Antonella
Antonellis
Antonello (name)
Giuseppe Antonicelli

References

Italian-language surnames
Patronymic surnames
Surnames from given names